Helen Wu (born 1956) is a martial artist living in Toronto, Ontario, Canada. The daughter of Wang Ju-Rong and Wu Chengde, Helen began her martial arts training at age three with her mother and her grandfather Wang Zi-Ping, the world-renowned Wushu Grandmaster.

Education and research

After she graduated from Shanghai University, Wu began teaching in the department of Sports Medicine.

Now, Wu  lives and teaches in Toronto, Ontario, Canada where she served on the board of the Canadian Taijiquan Federation and United Wushu Federation of Canada. She is a faculty member with the York University School of Kinesiology and Health Science.

Wu has acted as a consultant on several studies on the benefits of Chi-Kung:

The Effects of Vigorous Exercise Training on Motor Function and Functional, Fitness in Juvenile Arthritis. Dr. Brian M Feldman
Feasibility and Impact of Qigong as Compared to Aerobic Exercise in the Treatment of Childhood Chronic Musculo-Skeletal Pain: A Pilot Randomized Controlled Trial, Dr Shirley ML Tse MD FRCPC; Dr. Brian M Feldman

Professional accomplishments

Wu is an accomplished wushu coach; her training methods have produced medal-winning athletes.

Silver Medal, Group Events Category, U.S.A All-Taijiquan Competition (1999)
19 Medals including Silver and Bronze All-Round Grand Championships, U.S.A All-Taijiquan Competition (2000)
23 Medals including Bronze All-Round Grand Championships, U.S.A All-Taijiquan Competition (2001)

Wu co-authored with Wen-Ching Wu Tai Chi Single Fan for Health and Martial Arts  and Chi-Kung, Tai Chi and Fan: A Step by Step Training Course for Wellness and Personal Development. There were used as a text for her courses at York University.

Wu has also published articles for martial arts magazines: Flying Rainbow: The Fan of Martial Arts co-authored with Marsha Zeust for Kungfu Magazine (1999) and A Fan for Life for Inside Kung-fu magazine (2007).

External links 
 Helen Wu's Official Website

References

Chinese wushu practitioners
Chinese Muslims
Living people
Hui sportspeople
1956 births